Codfish Falls is a series of close-knit plunges and cascades, ending in a fan, that is fed by Fishers Brook, in Storrs, Connecticut (a village in the town of Mansfield). It can be accessed by a trail from a road of the same name. The falls has carved out a steep-sided gorge, averaging twenty feet deep, which is in sharp contrast to the surrounding land. It feeds into the nearby Fenton River.

See also
 Fishers Brook
 Fenton River
 Nipmuck Trail

References

External links
 Photograph of the falls Credit goes to the photographer.

Waterfalls of Connecticut
Mansfield, Connecticut
Landforms of Tolland County, Connecticut
Tourist attractions in Tolland County, Connecticut